Kyrmen Shylla (born 22 November 1988) is a politician from United Democratic Party and an MLA of the Meghalaya Legislative Assembly from Meghalaya, India. He is the youngest minister sworn in as one of the Cabinet Ministers by the then Governor of Meghalaya, Ganga Prasad, in the NPP-led coalition of the Meghalaya Democratic Alliance (MDA) government in the state.

Early life and career 
Kyrmen Shylla is the son of Smti. Kle Shylla and Shri. Kor Sympli, former MDC of the Jaitia Hilla Autonomous District Council. Shylla has fifteen siblings. He is the sixth child of the family. Shylla is a businessman.

Education 
Shylla completed his Secondary School Leaving Certificate, MBOSE, from Khliehriat Higher Secondary School, Khliehriat in 2004.

Political career 
Kyrmen Shylla won the Assembly election from Khliehriat Constituency as a UDP candidate in the year 2018.

Electoral records 
In 2018, Shylla contested the Khliehriat constituency as a UDP candidate, winning his first election to the state assembly. He won against Justine Dkhar of Bharatiya Janta Party with a victory margin of 8181 votes.

United Democratic Party 
Shylla was elected to the Meghalaya Legislative Assembly in 2018 from Khliehriat constituency as a candidate of the United Democratic Party.

Positions in government 
Kyrmen Shylla is presently in charge of Revenue & Disaster Management Department, Social Welfare Department, Excise.

Personal life 
Shylla is unmarried. He is keen to adopt a girl child to his family which was abandoned at his residence in November 2019.

External links
 Kyrmen Shylla On Facebook
 Kyrmen Shylla On Twitter
 Kyrmen Shylla On Instagram

References 

Living people
United Democratic Party (Meghalaya) politicians
Meghalaya MLAs 2018–2023
People from East Jaintia Hills district
1988 births